Uchechukwu Alozie “Uche” Okechukwu  also known as Deniz Uygar (born 27 September 1967) is a Nigerian former professional footballer who played as a central defender.

"Uchechukwu" is an Igbo name meaning "God´s will". He was also honoured as the foreign player who played in Turkey for the longest period of time (13 years), going on to obtain Turkish citizenship under the name Deniz Uygar.

The recipient of nearly 50 caps for Nigeria, Okechukwu represented the nation in two World Cups and as many Africa Cup of Nations, winning the latter tournament once.

Club career

Early years and Denmark
Born in Lagos, Okechukwu started his career playing for Flash Flamingoes and Iwuanyanwu Nationale, winning the 1988 and 1989 Nigeria Premier League with the latter.

In July 1990 he moved abroad to join Danish club Brøndby IF, being signed by newly appointed coach Morten Olsen alongside teammate Friday Elahor. Soon a part of the starting XI, Okechukwu helped the team win the 1990 and 1991 Danish championship, and was one of the mainstays of the squad that reached the semifinals of the 1990–91 UEFA Cup; while Elahor was touted by some as the next Brian Laudrup, he would soon leave for Africa Sports, while Okechukwu would be named the 1992's Brøndby IF Player of the Year.

Turkey and retirement
After appearing in the 1992 African Cup of Nations, where Nigeria reached the semi-finals, Okechukwu was linked to Turkish side Fenerbahçe SK for half a year, until he was bought in a DKK8 million transfer deal in November 1993. At Istanbul, he formed a defensive duo with former Brøndby teammate Jes Høgh, helping the club to its first Süper Lig championship in seven years in 1996.

Okechukwu played a further four seasons with Fenerbahçe, repeating league accolades in 2000–01. After nearly 250 official games he moved to fellow league team İstanbulspor AS, returning in 2007 to Nigeria first with Ocean Boys F.C. then with Bayelsa United FC (joining the latter in July 2008, and retiring shortly after, aged 41).

International career
Okechukwu made his debut for the Nigeria national team at the 1990 African Cup of Nations tournament, in a 5–1 loss against Algeria in their opening game. For the remainder of the competition the Super Eagles defense did not concede another goal, until they were beaten 1–0 by the same opponent in the final.

Altogether, Okechukwu played 47 internationals, winning the CAN in 1994 (2–1 against Zambia) and the 1996 Summer Olympics. He also represented the nation in two FIFA World Cups, helping it progress to two consecutive round-of- 16 contests as he appeared in seven complete matches combined, only missing out in the group stage 3–1 loss to Paraguay due to having collected two yellow cards.

Okechukwu retired after the 1998 edition's 4–1 loss to Denmark, having captained the squad on several occasions from 1996 onwards.

HonoursIwuanyanwu NationaleNigeria Premier League: 1987–88, 1988–89BrøndbyDanish Superliga: 1990, 1991Fenerbahçe1.Lig: 1995–96, 2000–01NigeriaAfrica Cup of Nations: 1994
Summer Olympic Games: 1996Individual'
Brøndby Player of the Year: 1992

References

External links
NigerianPlayers profile

1967 births
Living people
Naturalized citizens of Turkey
Sportspeople from Lagos
Nigerian footballers
Igbo sportspeople
Turkish footballers
Turkish people of Nigerian descent
Association football defenders
Nigeria Professional Football League players
Heartland F.C. players
Ocean Boys F.C. players
Bayelsa United F.C. players
Danish Superliga players
Brøndby IF players
Bendel United F.C. players
Süper Lig players
Fenerbahçe S.K. footballers
İstanbulspor footballers
Nigeria international footballers
1994 FIFA World Cup players
1995 King Fahd Cup players
1998 FIFA World Cup players
1990 African Cup of Nations players
1992 African Cup of Nations players
1994 African Cup of Nations players
Africa Cup of Nations-winning players
Footballers at the 1996 Summer Olympics
Olympic footballers of Nigeria
Olympic medalists in football
Medalists at the 1996 Summer Olympics
Olympic gold medalists for Nigeria
Nigerian expatriate footballers
Expatriate men's footballers in Denmark
Expatriate footballers in Turkey
Nigerian expatriate sportspeople in Denmark
Nigerian expatriate sportspeople in Turkey